Tytthoscincus hallieri is a species of skink. It is found in Malaysia and Indonesia.

References

hallieri
Reptiles of Malaysia
Reptiles of Indonesia
Reptiles described in 1905
Taxa named by Theodorus Willem van Lidth de Jeude
Reptiles of Borneo